In mathematics, a linked field is a field for which the quadratic forms attached to quaternion algebras have a common property.

Linked quaternion algebras
Let F be a field of characteristic not equal to 2.  Let A = (a1,a2) and B = (b1,b2) be quaternion algebras over F.  The algebras A and B are linked quaternion algebras over F if there is x in F such that A is equivalent to (x,y) and B is equivalent to (x,z).

The Albert form for A, B is

It can be regarded as the difference in the Witt ring of the ternary forms attached to the imaginary subspaces of A and B.  The quaternion algebras are linked if and only if the Albert form is isotropic.

Linked fields
The field F is linked if any two quaternion algebras over F are linked.  Every global and local field is linked since all quadratic forms of degree 6 over such fields are isotropic.

The following properties of F are equivalent:
 F is linked.
 Any two quaternion algebras over F are linked.
 Every Albert form (dimension six form of discriminant −1) is isotropic.
 The quaternion algebras form a subgroup of the Brauer group of F.
 Every dimension five form over F is a Pfister neighbour.
 No biquaternion algebra over F is a division algebra.

A nonreal linked field has u-invariant equal to 1,2,4 or 8.

References

 

Field (mathematics)
Quadratic forms
Quaternions